The second USS Tern (AM-31) was an  acquired by the U.S. Navy for the dangerous task of removing mines from minefields laid in the water to prevent ships from passing.

Tern was laid down on 7 September 1918 at Morris Heights, New York, by the Gas Engine & Power Co. and the C. L. Seabury Co.; launched on 22 March 1919; sponsored by Mrs. Bruce Scrimgeour; and commissioned on 17 May 1919 as Minesweeper No. 31.

West Coast operations
Tern was assigned to the United States Pacific Fleet and steamed to the west coast. On 1 October, the minesweeper joined Train Squadron (TrainRon) 2, Fleet Base Force, at Pearl Harbor. Her squadron operated in support of the Battle Force for the next nine years. Tern was designated AM-31 on 17 July 1920 when the Navy first assigned hull numbers to its ships. In July 1927, Tern and her squadron moved to San Diego, California, and operated out of that port for six years before their base was shifted to San Pedro, California. Tern remained with TrainRon 2, Base Force, and accompanied it to Pearl Harbor on 19 June 1941 when the squadron was again assigned to Hawaii.

Japanese attack on Pearl Harbor
When the Japanese attacked Pearl Harbor on 7 December 1941, Tern was alongside  in the first repair slip at the north end of 1010 Dock, upkeep undergoing. All of her machinery was dead, and she was receiving steam and electricity from the dock. She was notified of the attack at 0753 and immediately made preparations to get underway. Twelve minutes later, her gunners opened fire with Lewis machine guns on an incoming enemy plane which was seen to crash near the Officers' Club. At 0943, the minesweeper moved out into the harbor and picked up 47 survivors from various ships. The fires on West Virginia were extinguished at 1430 on 8 December, and the minesweeper moved back alongside Arizona until the fires on that battleship were brought under control, shortly after noon on the 9th. Tern was not damaged by the Japanese attack.

World War II Pacific Theatre operations
On 9 January 1942, Tern began towing a fuel oil barge to Johnston Island. She delivered it on the 13th and returned to Pearl Harbor. Tern got underway for the Society Islands on 9 February, arrived at Borabora on the 18th, and was assigned duty there as station ship. On 1 March, the Base Force was renamed Service Force, Pacific; and, on 1 June, the minesweeper was redesignated AT-142, an ocean tug. The tug returned to Pearl Harbor on 27 January and, five weeks later, headed for San Pedro, California, and an overhaul.
 
Tern arrived back at Pearl Harbor on 23 May and joined the Service Squadron, U.S. 3rd Fleet, operating in the Hawaiian area. Her duties for the next year consisted of recovering training torpedoes, towing targets for bombing and gunnery practice, and assisting other ships. On 15 May 1944, her designation was changed to ATO-142 (Ocean Tug, Old).

Supporting the liberation of the Philippines
On 9 July, Tern joined a convoy headed for the Marshall Islands. She arrived at Eniwetok on the 28th and operated from that base for the next five months towing craft to Majuro, Tarawa, Ulithi, and Guam. On 4 January 1945, the tug shifted her base of operations to Ulithi for five months. On 26 May, Tern got underway for Leyte, Philippine Islands. She arrived at San Pedro on 1 June and was assigned duty as a target towing ship with Submarine Training, Pacific Fleet, at Guam. The next week, Tern began the long voyage, via Eniwetok and Pearl Harbor, to the United States.

Post-war deactivation
Tern arrived at San Francisco, California, in mid-October and began preparing for inactivation. She was decommissioned on 23 November and struck from the Naval Vessel Register on 5 December 1945.

Awards
Tern received one battle star for World War II.

References

External links
 
 USS Tern, Report of Pearl Harbor Attack
 USS Tern
 uboat.net - USS Tern

 

Lapwing-class minesweepers
Ships built in Morris Heights, Bronx
1918 ships
World War I minesweepers of the United States
Ships present during the attack on Pearl Harbor
World War II auxiliary ships of the United States
Lapwing-class minesweepers converted to tugs